The Chalk Buttes,  el. , is a small mountain range northeast of Powderville, Montana in Carter County, Montana.

See also
 List of mountain ranges in Montana

Notes

Mountain ranges of Montana
Landforms of Carter County, Montana